Antonio Aldo Caracciolo (born 30 June 1990) is an Italian professional footballer who plays as a defender for Serie B club Pisa.

Career
Caracciolo was a youth product of Lombard club F.C. Internazionale Milano. He was a player of the under-16 team in 2005–06 season. Caracciolo then left for fellow Lombard club A.C. Pavia, at first on loan. He made his professional debut in the second half of 2007–08 Serie C2 season.

On 29 January 2010 A.S. Bari signed the defender on loan until 30 June 2010. He was selected as a substitute once under coach Giampiero Ventura, on 16 May 2010, but did not come off the bench.

Genoa
On 20 July 2010 he was signed by Genoa. He left the club on loan with Gubbio.

In July 2011 he was loaned to Gubbio again but suffered a minor injury in pre-season.

Brescia
In summer 2012 Caracciolo was farmed to Serie B club Brescia Calcio on a 4-year contract on a co-ownership deal. The club acquired half of the registration rights of the player for a peppercorn fee. In June 2013 Brescia acquired Caracciolo outright.

On 19 July 2013 Caracciolo was transferred to Lega Pro Prima Divisione club U.S. Cremonese on a temporary deal. The club also had an option to sign him outright.

In summer 2014 Caracciolo returned to Brescia, entering the first team squad again.

On 1 December 2015, Caracciolo signed a new contract with Brescia, adding 2 more year to his current contract. However, he was sold in summer 2016.

Verona
On 11 August 2016 Caracciolo was signed by Hellas Verona F.C. He was extremely criticized for this by the Brescia's supporters because Brescia and Verona are huge rivals. After playing 33 matches he gave his contributions to help Verona to get back to Serie A after 2016 relegation. He did his Serie A debut in a home 0–0 against U.C. Sampdoria where he played the full 90 minutes. He scored his first goal in Serie A (and for Verona) in a surprising 3–0 home win against A.C. Milan.

On 10 March 2018 he scored the winning goal in a 1–0 win in the Derby della Scala against Chievo.

Cremonese
On 16 January 2019, Caracciolo joined to Cremonese on loan with an obligation to buy.

Pisa
On 27 January 2020, he signed with Pisa.

Career statistics

References

External links
 
 AIC profile (data by football.it) 
 

1990 births
Living people
Italian footballers
F.C. Pavia players
S.S.C. Bari players
A.S. Gubbio 1910 players
Brescia Calcio players
U.S. Cremonese players
Hellas Verona F.C. players
Pisa S.C. players
Serie A players
Serie B players
Serie C players
Association football defenders
Footballers from Sardinia